Girl Comics is the name of two comic-book series published by Marvel Comics and its forerunners, Timely Comics and Atlas Comics. The first, debuting in 1949, ran 35 issues, changing its title to Girl Confessions with issue #13 (March 1952). The second was a three-issue limited series published in 2010.

Publication history

First series (1949–1954)
The initial Marvel Comics publication entitled Girl Comics was an ongoing romance comics/girls'-adventure series edited by Stan Lee that ran 12 issues (October 1949 - January 1952), first by Marvel's 1940s predecessor, Timely Comics, and shortly afterward by the company's 1950s iteration, Atlas Comics. It was renamed Girl Confessions with issue #13 (March 1952) and ran a total 35 issues, through cover-date August 1954.

Artist contributors to this series included John Buscema and Al Hartley in issue #1, Bob Brown and Bill Everett in #3, Russ Heath in #5, Ann Brewster, Mike Esposito, and Dick Rockwell in #8, and Bernard Krigstein in #12. Contributors to multiple issues of Girl Confessions included Hartley, Jay Scott Pike, Morris Weiss, and Golden Age Batman artist Jerry Robinson.

Girl Comics
The first four issues of Girl Comics were written as typical romance comics, valuing plot over character development. Most narratives were recycled, not changing drastically between issues. Issues #5 through #12, however, adopted a new subtitle, Mystery, Adventure, Suspense! and featured plot-lines similar to those in Nancy Drew novels.

Girl Confessions
{| class="wikitable" style="text-align:center;"
! width=25%| Issue
! width=25%| Title
! width=25%| Publication date
|-
||13
|| Bride with a Broken Heart
|| March 1952
|-
|| 14
|| Love or Infatuation?
|| May 1952
|-
|| 15
|| Untitled
|| June 1952
|-
|| 16
|| I'll Never Forget You!
|| July 1952
|-
|| 17
|| The Soldier's Wife!
|| August 1952
|-
|| 18
|| We Both Loved Jerry!
|| September 1952
|-
|| 19
|| Wallflower
|| October 1952
|-
|| 20
|| His Last Goodbye
|| November 1952
|-
|| 21
|| Unwanted
|| December 1952
|-
|| 22
|| Untitled
|| January 1953
|-
|| 23
|| The Man Who Kissed Me
|| February 1953
|-
|| 24
|| The Way You Kiss, Martha's Man, The Lonely Night, Love Note
|| March 1953
|-
|| 25
|| Back Into His Arms
|| April 1953
|-
|| 26
|| The Man I Must Marry
|| June 1953
|-
|| 27
|| Grounds for Marriage"
|| August 1953
|-
|| 28
|| Love Me or Leave Me|| September 1953
|-
|| 29
|| The Truth About Thelma Johnson|| October 1953
|-
|| 30
|| Tall, Dark and Hands Off|| January 1954
|-
|| 31
|| When the Real Thing Comes Along|| February 1954
|-
|| 32
|| Schoolgirl Crush|| March 1954
|-
|| 33
|| A Boy and a Girl|| April 1954
|-
|| 34
|| Affair of the Heart|| June 1954
|-
|| 35
|| Going Steady|| August 1954
|}

Second series (2010)

The second Girl Comics was a three-issue limited series released as a part of Marvel's year-long Marvel Women project. Girl Comics was entirely written, colored, illustrated and lettered by female authors and artists. Sister titles published during this period under the Marvel Women project, included the limited series and one-shots  Heralds, Black Widow, Namora, Lady Deadpool, and Her-oes. It ran three issues cover-dated May to September 2010. The collection was originally conceived as a celebration of both the 30th anniversary of She-Hulk and the National Women's History Project.

Jeanine Schaefer, one of the editors, said of the initiative's timing: "Because 2010 is the 30th anniversary of the first appearance of She-Hulk, we got together to brainstorm some ideas for a celebration of women at Marvel Comics, much like we did for the 70th anniversary...." She said the publisher felt the potentially controversial word "girl" in the title could be reclaimed: "It was one of the first titles we thought of (the actual first one, I think), because it pulled double-duty: Not only was it the name of an old Marvel romance title, it has a word in it that we could take back".

The 2010 series contains contributions from Devin K. Grayson, Louise Simonson, Amanda Conner, Jill Thompson, Trina Robbins, and Molly Crabapple, among others. The 52-page first issue included stories of the male characters Nightcrawler, the Punisher, and Spider-Man in addition to stories of the superheroines She-Hulk, Venus, and Jean Grey. In addition, a two-page text article spotlighted Marvel Comics' Silver Age secretary and later independent comics publisher Flo Steinberg

Illustrator and cartoonist Stephanie Buscema, who penciled and inked the eight-page story featuring Venus, is a granddaughter of the major comics artist John Buscema, whose work appeared in the first issue of the 1949 series.

References

External links

Girl Comics (1949) at Atlas Tales

Girl Confessions at Atlas Tales

Zawisza, Doug. Review: Girl Comics #1, Comic Book Resources, March 3, 2010
McDonald, Amanda, and Jeff Marsick, "Best Shots Comic Reviews", Girl Comics #1 (two reviews), Newsarama'', March 8, 2010

Comics magazines published in the United States
1949 comics debuts
1952 comics endings
2010 comics debuts
Atlas Comics titles
Romance comics
Superhero comics
Timely Comics titles
Magazines established in 1949
Magazines disestablished in 1952
Magazines established in 2010
Magazines disestablished in 2010